Topgallant Islands is an island group  in the Australian state of  South Australia located in the Investigator Group about  south west of Cape Finniss on the west coast of Eyre Peninsula.  The group was discovered and named by Matthew Flinders on 13 February 1802.  The island group has enjoyed protected area status since the 1960s and since 2011, it has been part of the Investigator Group Wilderness Protection Area.

Description

The southernmost rock is reported as being a ‘sharp pyramid’ of  height.

The name used for the island group varies from the name given by Flinders (i.e. Topgallant Isles) as follows: Topgallant Islands, Top-gallant Islands, Top-Gallant Isles and Top Gallant Isles.

Access to Topgallant Island by boat is reported as not being possible due to a ‘combination of deep water swells, steep shores and sheer walls of rotten stone’.  A survey carried in 1980 used a helicopter to land personnel on the islet.

Formation, geology and oceanography
The Topgallant Islands were formed about 8750 years ago following the rise of sea levels at the start of the Holocene.

Geologically, the constituent parts of the Topgallant Islands are the remnants of a stack of calcarenite strata sitting on a now-submerged ridge of granite which is now submerged and which has been extensively eroded by wave action since the commencement of sea level rise.

Flora and fauna

Flora
Vegetation is restricted generally to the summit of the islet where the soil is sufficiently deep to permit the growth of shrubs and two of the larger rocks.  A survey conducted in 1980 found ‘four distinct plant communities’ to present as ‘low shrublands’ dominated by chenopods (in two instances), nitre bush  and pointed twinleaf.  Twenty species were recorded during the 1980 survey including the invasive species African boxthorn and common iceplant.

Fauna
Vertebrate animals observed on the island group include marbled geckos and the following bird species: Richard's pipit, white-faced heron, Nankeen kestrel, white-bellied sea-eagle, welcome swallow, silver gull, rock parrot, white-faced storm petrel, short-tailed shearwater and common starling.

History

European discovery and use
Flinders discovered the island group on Saturday, 13 February 1802, and named it due to it ‘resembling ships under sail’.  On the same day, Flinders also nominated it as one of the constituent parts of the Investigator Group.

Protected areas status

The Topgallant Islands first received protected area status as part of a fauna reserve declared under the Fauna Conservation Act 1964 either on 1 September 1966 or 16 March 1967.  The island group and other adjoining islands became part of the Investigator Group Conservation Park proclaimed under the National Parks and Wildlife Act 1972 in 1972.  On 25 August 2011, it was one of the island groups excised from the Investigator Group Conservation Park to form the Investigator Group Wilderness Protection Area.  Since 2012, the waters adjoining the Topgallant  Islands have been part of a sanctuary zone in the Investigator Marine Park.

See also
List of islands of Australia
Investigator Islands Important Bird Area

Citations and references

Citations

References
	

Islands of South Australia
Uninhabited islands of Australia
Great Australian Bight